The Bay Meadows Derby was an American Thoroughbred horse race for three-year-old horses of either gender on the Longden Turf Course at Bay Meadows Racetrack.  Bay Meadows was in San Mateo, California.

The Bay Meadows Derby first ran in 1954 on the dirt.  That year's winner of the Kentucky Derby won the first Bay Meadows Derby, the California-bred Determine.  In 1957, Round Table (horse) won the race, the first of many as a  three-year-old.

The Derby, revived in 1978 at one and one/sixteenth mile, is a Grade III grass event set at one and one/eighth mile, and offers a purse of $100,000.

Bay Meadows Racetrack closed in 2008.  There were ten final race dates run in August 2008 for the San Mateo County Fair, with the last official race occurring on August 17, 2008.

Past winners

 2007 - Unusual Suspect (Kyle Kaenel)
 2006 - Proudinsky (Ger.) (Patrick Valenzuela)
 2005 - Race Not Run
 2004 - Congressionalhonor (Russell Baze)
 2003 - Stanley Park (Eric Saint-Martin)
 2002 - Royal Gem (Russell Baze)
 2001 - Blue Stellar
 2000 - Walkslikeaduck (Eddie Delahoussaye)
 1999 - Mula Gula (Rafael Meza)
 1998 - Takarian
 1997 - Shellbacks
 1996 - Ocean Queen
 1995 - Virginia Carnival
 1994 - Marvins Faith
 1993 - Ranger
 1992 - Star Recruit
 1991 - Bistro Garden
 1990 - Sekondi
 1989 - Irish
 1988 - Coax Me Clyde
 1987 - Hot and Smoggy
 1986 - Le Belvedere
 1985 - Minutes Away
 1984 - Mangaki
 1983 - Interco
 1982 - Ask Me
 1981 - Silveyville
 1980 - Fleet Tempo (Roberto Gonzalez)
 1979 - Nain Bleu
 1978 - Quip 
 Race Not Run
 1957 - Round Table
 1954 - Determine

External links
  Bay Meadows online

Bay Meadows Racetrack
Graded stakes races in the United States
Horse races in California
Turf races in the United States
Flat horse races for three-year-olds
Recurring sporting events established in 1954
Recurring events disestablished in 2007
1954 establishments in California
2007 disestablishments in California